The PMMC (Protected Mission Module Carrier) G5 is a family of light tracked vehicles designed and manufactured by  Flensburger Fahrzeugbau GmbH (FFG) of Germany. Although it is similar in appearance and design to the American M113, and the company manufacturers modernised versions of that vehicle, the PMMC G5 is an all-new ground-up design.

As of 2022, it has only been selected for use by the Norwegian Army and is now described by FFG as a "technology demonstrator".

Overview

Background
Commencing in 2012, the vehicle was developed in a private venture as an alternative to modernised M113-based vehicles, and to compete in global markets against modern tracked and wheeled vehicles in a similar weight range (e.g. Boxer, CV90, etc.). It is built around a modular design allowing the basic platform to be easily configured into the variant which best suits the mission requirements i.e. armoured personnel carrier, command and control vehicle, infantry fighting vehicle, etc.

Design Objectives
The vehicle was designed to fulfil the following objectives: 
 360-degree situation awareness
 Air, rail, road and sea transportable
 Class-leading off-road performance in mud, sand and snow
 Enhanced crew and troop comfort
 High level integrated mine and IED protection with further armour upgrades available
 Improved reliability through utilisation of proven components
 Integrated communications and battlefield management systems
 Maximum crew and troop survivability
 Reduced maintenance costs through utilisation of common components across variants and other vehicles
 Reduced unit costs through utilisation of COTS technologies
 Reduced total life-cycle cost
 Single-unit power pack removal

Operating Environment
The vehicle has been designed for operations in the following environments: 
 Operating temperature range: 
 Climbing gradient: 60 degrees
 Lateral inclination: 30 degrees

Design
The original design was based upon a common full-length hull upon which the different mission variants would be provided through reconfigured interiors and external equipment and weapons fitments. The design was later amended to include a version with a truncated rear hull and a rear flatbed cargo deck to support logistical variants.

Chassis and Hull
Maximum payload capacity is 

The design is unusual in that it does not provide a hatch for the driver, who is instead located behind an armoured glass window. Maximised crew survivability is provided through a blast-resistant hull design providing mine and IED protection, and a decoupled floor to minimise the prorogation of the blast to the interior. Ballistic protection against projectiles along with protection against fragments and splinters is provided through modular (applique) armour which can be easily increased for high-threat environments. Access to the rear troop/cargo compartment is provided through a large electrically operated ramp with a separately manually opening door.

The chassis features torsion bar suspension and hydraulic shock absorbers with six (6) road wheels each side.

Interior
The vehicle has a total of  interior volume, which is greater than that for a M113.

Crew and troops are provided with individual blast-resistant ergonomically designed seats. The driver is provided with a window of armoured glass along with periscopes and day/night cameras. Rear troop seats are folding and include footrests to maximise combat capability even after an 8-hour cross country ride.

The interior, including stowages, is configurable for different mission parameters (e.g. ambulance, APC, etc.).

Powertrain
The engine is a MTU 6V199 TE21 turbo-diesel which is based upon the Mercedes-Benz OM 501 and features charge air cooling to increase power and reliability. Output is up to 460 kW of power and 2200 Nm of torque and is controlled by an electronic engine management system.

A ZF LSG 1000 HD automatic transmission with six (6) forward and two (2) reverse gears operates through a hydrodynamic torque converter and features a hydrostatic steering system which provides true pivot turns within the vehicle's own length.  
  
Drive is through the front sprocket and uses single piece composite rubber tracks.

Systems
The vehicle features "Vectronics", the integration of modular communications and combat information systems, and provides: 
 electronic displays
 integrated and expandable communication suites
 integrated and expandable battlefield management suites
 interfaces for weapon stations
 interfaces for power supplies to troops

A modular approach was adapted using COTS technologies and open-system standards wherever possible, so as to allow easier upgrade paths and reduced costs.

Weapons
Although the basic model is unarmed, most variants will feature a remote weapons station fitted with either a 7.62mm general-purpose machine gun (GPMG) or a 0.50 in heavy machine gun (HMG), although larger calibre weapons may be offered as an option. Unlike many vehicles against which it will compete for sales, a version with a crewed turret is not currently available.

Development
A prototype of the vehicle was first displayed at the Eurosatory International Defence Show in Paris, France, in 2014. The vehicle underwent extensive testing in a variety of different operating conditions, including summer testing in sand in Abu Dhabi and winter testing in snow in Norway. Limited production commenced in 2018 with full-scale production commencing in early 2021.

Variants
FFG originally proposed the following variants:
 Ambulance
 Armoured Personnel Carrier
 Command & Control
 Engineer's Fitter
 Explosive Ordnance Disposal
 Infantry Fighting Vehicle
 Joint Fire Support Team
 Mortar Carrier
 Reconnaissance
 Repair & Recovery 
 Short Range Air Defence
 Transport & Logistics

However, as of 2022 only the following variants have been displayed:

Armoured Ambulance
Unarmed version with stripped interior giving room to carry either two stretchers or one stretcher and seating for three patients or medical staff.  Storage for medical equipment is provided.

Armoured Combat Support Vehicle (ACSV)
Development of the Armoured Combat Support Vehicle saw the rear hull of the original design truncated and replaced with a rear flat cargo deck with a payload capacity of 8.5 tonnes, so as to carry interchangeable ISO 10-foot containers. It was this revised design which has entered production and as of 2022 is the only variant to have entered full-scale production.

Armoured Personnel Carrier (APC)
Basic variant equipped with a remote weapon station (RWS) fitted with either a MG 3 or FN MAG GPMG, or M2 HMG. The roof features a large double hatch over the rear troop compartment or optional individual troop hatches.  Carries 10 to 12 troops.

Command and Control Vehicle (CCV)
This variant is equipped with a Dynamit Nobel Defence (DND) Dual FeWaS RWS equipped with a Rheinmetall RMG 12.7mm HMG and DND's ASL-90 twin launcher for its RGW 90-HH and RGW 90-AS rockets. It is also equipped with a Comrod Communication  elevating mast which can be equipped with various sensor packages.

Infantry Fighting Vehicle (IFV)
Very similar to the APC variant, with additional applique armour, smoke dischargers and an Krauss-Maffei Wegmann FLW200+ RWS fitted with a Rheinmetall Rh-202 20mm autocannon. Troop capacity is possibly reduced to 8–10.

Operators

Current Operators
 : In May 2018 the Norwegian Defence Material Agency announced it had a signed a contract for the purchase of 44 of the Armoured Combat Support Vehicle (ACSV) variant of the G5, with a potential for future orders of between 75 and 150 vehicles. The first vehicles are expected to enter service with the Norwegian Army in summer 2022.

Potential Operators
 : in 2014 the Royal Danish Army trialled the G5 as a replacement for is ageing fleet of M113-based vehicles, in a competition against the Nexter VBCI 8x8, BAE Systems-Hägglunds CV90 Armadillo, General Dynamics European Land Systems(GDELS) Santa Bárbara Sistemas ASCOD 2 and the GDELS-Mowag Piranha 5s 8x8. In May 2015 the Danish Defence Acquisition and Logistic Organisation announced the Piranha 5s as the successful candidate.

Similar Vehicles
 AIFV
 FV432
 M113

Notes

External links
 PMMC G5 at FFG
 FFG PMMC G5 Trials on YouTube

References

Armoured fighting vehicles of Germany
Armoured personnel carriers of the post–Cold War period
Tracked armoured fighting vehicles